The Uzbekistan national baseball team is the national baseball team of Uzbekistan. The team represents Uzbekistan in international competitions.

National baseball teams in Asia
Baseball